is a 1969 Japanese samurai film directed by Hideo Gosha set during the end of the Tokugawa shogunate and based on the lives of the historical Four Hitokiri of the Bakumatsu. It is notable for starring the famous author Yukio Mishima.

Plot
Izō soon becomes a well known and successful killer, and he is stubbornly loyal to Hanpeita. However, Sakamoto Ryōma warns him that he is merely "Takechi's dog" and that Hanpeita will end up betraying him. After Izō fouls a night attack by the Kinnō-Tō on Ishibe Station by revealing his identity, Hanpeita's wrath at his blunder and resentment at his own subordinacy begins to test Izō's loyalty. Eventually abandoning Hanpeita, the regretful Izō returns and apologizes. He is then ordered to assassinate the aristocrat  using the sword of Tanaka Shinbei. The assassination is successful, and during his interrogation over Anegakōji's death, Tanaka commits harakiri after his recovered sword is presented to him as evidence. As Hanpeita becomes increasingly determined to succeed in his plan to become daimyo of Tosa by eliminating his opponents, it becomes necessary to sacrifice Izō, which he does by betraying him after he is arrested as a rōnin by the Aizu Mimawarigumi and later by trying to poison him with amygdalin-drugged sake (座枯らし). Izō survives, but, disillusioned, confesses to his murders for the Kinnō-Tō, and is condemned to crucifixion. Before being killed, he is told that Hanpeita will be forced to commit harakiri.

Cast
Shintaro Katsu as Okada Izō
Tatsuya Nakadai as Takechi Hanpeita
Yujiro Ishihara as Sakamoto Ryōma
Yukio Mishima as Tanaka Shinbei
Mitsuko Baisho as Omino
Ichirō Nakatani
Kunie Tanaka
Noboru Nakaya as Anegakōji Kintomo
Tsutomu Shimomoto as Matsuda
Yūsuke Takita as Hiramastu
Takumi Shinjo as Minakawa

Production
 Yoshinobu Nishioka - Art direction

References

External links

1969 films
Daiei Film films
Jidaigeki films
Samurai films
Films directed by Hideo Gosha
Films set in Bakumatsu
1960s Japanese films